Pieter Verhees (born 8 December 1989) is a Belgian volleyball player, member of the Belgium men's national volleyball team, participant of the 2014 World Championship. On club level he plays for Greenyard Maaseik.

Personal life
Pieter Verhees was born in Lommel and raised in Overpelt, Belgium. In his youth he played basketball, football, karate, etc. but eventually moved to the class with volleyball. Pieter has three younger brothers. He plays on the position of middle blocker. Verhees swapped for the season of 2011–2012, the volleyball team Euphony Asse-Lennik for Noliko Maaseik. After playing there for one year he relocated to Italy to play in Top Volley Latina for 2 years. After this he went to Pallavolo Modena where he won the Italian cup and ended 2nd in competition. The 2 next years, he played for Gi Group Monza, where he became the best middle player of the Italian competition. The Italian adventure continued and Pieter played one more year in Volley Callipo and one in Bunge Ravenna.

Sporting achievements

Clubs
 CEV Cup
  2007/2008 – with Noliko Maaseik
  2012/2013 – with Andreoli Latina
 CEV Challenge Cup
  2013/2014 – with Andreoli Latina
 National championships
 2006/2007  Belgian SuperCup, with Noliko Maaseik
 2006/2007  Belgian Cup, with Noliko Maaseik
 2006/2007  Belgian Championship, with Noliko Maaseik
 2007/2008  Belgian Cup, with Noliko Maaseik
 2007/2008  Belgian Championship, with Noliko Maaseik
 2010/2011  Belgian Championship, with Euphony Asse-Lennik
 2011/2012  Belgian SuperCup, with Noliko Maaseik
 2011/2012  Belgian Cup, with Noliko Maaseik
 2011/2012  Belgian Championship, with Noliko Maaseik
 2014/2015  Italian Cup, with Parmareggio Modena
 2014/2015  Italian Championship, with Parmareggio Modena

Youth national team
 2007  CEV U19 European Championship

External links
 Player profile at CEV.eu
 Player profile at LegaVolley.it
 Player profile at PlusLiga.pl
 Player profile at WorldofVolley.com
 Player profile at Volleybox.net

References

1989 births
Living people
People from Overpelt
Belgian men's volleyball players
Belgian expatriate sportspeople in Italy
Expatriate volleyball players in Italy
Belgian expatriate sportspeople in Poland
Expatriate volleyball players in Poland
Modena Volley players
Warta Zawiercie players
Sportspeople from Limburg (Belgium)
21st-century Belgian people